William Theophilus Anderton (16 March 1891 – 20 January 1966) was a New Zealand politician of the Labour Party. He served as Minister of Internal Affairs in the second Labour Government, from 1957 to 1960.

Early life

Anderton was born in West Bromwich, Staffordshire, England. He married Annie Gertrude Mason in 1913, and they had two daughters and one son. He served in the British Army (Royal Artillery) in World War I. The family arrived in New Zealand in 1921 and settled in Christchurch for a year, before moving to Auckland.

Political career

In 1933 Anderton was elected to the Auckland City Council on a Labour Party ticket. He was re-elected in both 1935 and 1938 but was defeated in 1941. In 1944 he was Labour's candidate for Mayor of Auckland City, but was defeated by John Allum in an election which saw all Labour candidates defeated.

He represented the Eden electorate from 1935 to 1946, and then the  electorate from 1946 to 1960, when he retired.

In 1947 Anderton was one of three Labour MPs who supported Frank Langstone's contentious proposal that the government make the state-owned Bank of New Zealand the sole legal issuer of bank credit over loans and overdrafts in an attempt to secure state control over the means of exchange. The proposal was rejected as too radical however.

In 1953, Anderton was awarded the Queen Elizabeth II Coronation Medal.

Anderton was an agitator against the leadership of Walter Nash during Labour's spell in opposition in the 1950s. He was one of the main instigators of the challenge to Nash in June 1954, which was unsuccessful. As a result, Anderton together with Phil Connolly and Arnold Nordmeyer were called before Labour's National Executive and given warnings about the threat of divisiveness to the party.

After Labour won the  Anderton was nominated as a candidate for the position of Speaker of the New Zealand House of Representatives, but lost the caucus ballot to Christchurch mayor Robert Macfarlane. He was then nominated to stand for a seat in cabinet in the Second Labour Government. In the third ballot for the final seat he was tied with Mount Albert MP Warren Freer. Freer cast his own vote in the next ballot for the 66 year old Anderton out of gratitude as he had helped Freer into politics years earlier.

He was appointed as Minister of Internal Affairs and Minister of Civil Defence from 1957 to 1960 in the Second Labour Government.

Private life
Anderton was the father-in-law of Labour MP Norman Douglas. Two of Anderton's grandchildren, brothers Malcolm and Roger Douglas, also became MPs.

He died in the Auckland suburb of Ōrākei in 1966.

Notes

References

1891 births
1966 deaths
British emigrants to New Zealand
New Zealand Labour Party MPs
New Zealand Methodists
Auckland City Councillors
Members of the Cabinet of New Zealand
New Zealand MPs for Auckland electorates
British Army personnel of World War I
Members of the New Zealand House of Representatives
Unsuccessful candidates in the 1931 New Zealand general election
Unsuccessful candidates in the 1928 New Zealand general election
People from West Bromwich